Florian Scheiber (born 17 May 1987) is an Austrian former alpine skier two-time winner of the Europa Cup overall title in 2009 and 2012.

Career
In his career he has started in 56 World Cup races in eight seasons, obtaining a 4th place in downhill as his best result, he retired at just 28 years old following yet another serious injury he had on Kitzbühel's Streif in a timed race of the World Cup.

World Cup results
Top 10

Europa Cup results
Scheiber has won two overall Europa Cup and one specialty standings.

FIS Alpine Ski Europa Cup
Overall: 2009, 2012
Super-G: 2012

References

External links
 

1987 births
Living people
Austrian male alpine skiers